In the European Union, harmonisation of law (or simply harmonisation) is the process of creating common standards across the internal market. Though each EU member state has primary responsibility for the regulation of most matters within their jurisdiction, and consequently each has its own laws, harmonisation aims to:
 create consistency of laws, regulations, standards and practices, so that the same rules will apply to businesses that operate in more than one member state, and so that the businesses of one state do not obtain an economic advantage over those in another as a result of different rules.
 reduced compliance and regulatory burdens for businesses operating nationally or trans-nationally.

An objective of the European Union to achieve uniformity in laws of member states is to facilitate free trade and protect citizens.

Harmonisation is a process of ascertaining the admitted limits of international unification but does not necessarily amount to a vision of total uniformity.

Characteristics of harmonisation
Harmonisation is usually not comprehensive but partial, in that it does not seek to create a sole authority of law on a particular subject. This is because measures to harmonise law cannot go further than that which is necessary.

Harmonisation is unsystematic. The directives of the European Union do not focus on or contain comprehensive regulation of the entire law. The directives regulate some very specific issues and they regulate them only for particular situations or circumstances and only for particular types of parties. This is most prevalent in European Union contract law.

Harmonisation generally takes place on two levels of governance, the overarching body and each of the members individually. Taking the European Union, the two levels are the European level and national level. Although both European and national legislators share the legislative responsibilities, neither of these bodies has final responsibility for the whole. Also, there is no superior political authority which has the final say on who is responsible for what, i.e. no overarching authority over the European and national legislators.  The European Court of Justice may however determine the extent of harmonisation when determining cases.

Harmonisation is dynamic, in that the instruments of harmonisation aim at change, in particular improving and establishing consistent conditions for the operation of legal principles.

Harmonisation versus unification
The unification and harmonisation of laws are similar in the sense that both involve approximating several legal systems and both are also oriented towards establishing some level of integration from a previous situation characterized by diversity. On the other hand, unification and harmonisation have different fundamental aims. The former works towards complete unity in substance and detail whereas the latter avoids complete uniformity, and is primarily concerned with approximating the fundamental principles of national laws. In unification, for example, a new law completely replaces the national laws that have existed before. A harmonisation law on the European level does not exceed mere approximation and leaves the national differences in place as long as they are not expressly regulated by the harmonising law. Here, national laws merely become closer but not identical. 

Unification also focuses on substituting or combining two or more legal systems and replacing them with a single system. Harmonisation on the other hand seeks to co-ordinate different legal systems by “eliminating major differences and creating minimum requirements or standards”“Unlike unification which contemplates the substitution of two or more legal systems with one single system, harmonisation of law arises exclusively in comparative law literature, and especially in conjunction with interjurisdictional, private transactions. Harmonisation seeks to ‘effect an approximation or coordination of different legal provision or systems by eliminating major differences and creating minimum requirements or standards’”.

Harmonisation can be seen as a step towards unification and, in a way, harmonisation aims or strives towards unification.

Efforts to achieve harmonisation
Harmonisation is not a new concept. However, the problem is that no harmonisation project has ever reached completion. That is due to the nature of harmonisation, it is designed to incorporate different legal systems under a basic framework.

This is the appeal of harmonisation, it takes into account the local factors yet applies general principles to make a consistent framework of law. It generally incorporates local factors under a relatively unified framework. An example of harmonisation can be drawn from the European Union and the use of Directives.

Directives require transposition into the domestic legal system of the Member State in order to become effective. If a Member State fails to transpose the Directive in a timely manner or fails to do it at all, the Directive will take 'direct effect', that is, individuals are able to derive rights from that Directive directly despite not being transposed into domestic law. A Directive could be transposed through enactment under legislation from the national parliament or through agreement by reference. The Directives are flexible to the extent that the national authorities of the Member States have the choice of the form and method of the implementation of the Directive. This takes into account the fact that Member States have differing legal systems. Hence this allows the establishment of a harmonised framework of laws whilst preserving the established national laws of each member. This is the major appeal of harmonisation over unification.

Harmonisation can be achieved in two ways, actively or passively. The most common is the active pursuit of harmonisation usually through the enactment of legislation which incorporates the harmonised principles into the local law. Passive harmonisation may occur through non-legislative agreements or a convergence of case law. So far, passive harmonisation is the least successful since the non-legislative agreements tend to be voluntary. The convergence of case law is more promising since:
"All that matters is that the courts of different European States achieve similar results in the same cases, regardless of which norms, doctrines or procedures they apply in order to reach this end."

Harmonisation and convergence of law
Harmonisation is synonymous with convergence of the law however harmonisation is usually associated via active pursuit through enacting legislation whereas convergence is generally associated with a passive approach such as a natural convergence of law through custom and frequent use of harmonised principles.

The most prominent example of harmonisation in international law is UNCITRAL (United Nations Commission on International Trade Law).

See also
European Union law
Home state regulation
Mutual recognition agreement
28th regime
Uniform Act

Notes

European Union legal terminology
European Union law